Rady Adosinda Gramane (born 11 November 1995) is a Mozambican boxer. She represented Mozambique at the 2018 Commonwealth Games held in Gold Coast, Australia. In the same year, she also competed in the women's middleweight event at the 2018 AIBA Women's World Boxing Championships held in New Delhi, India.

Gramane was discovered by Mozambican former Olympic boxer Lucas Sinoia, who invited her to try the sport and became her coach.

In 2019, she won the silver medal in the women's middleweight event at the African Games held in Rabat, Morocco.

In 2020, she qualified at the African Olympic Qualification Tournament held in Diamniadio, Senegal to compete at the 2020 Summer Olympics in Tokyo, Japan, where she competed in the middleweight category. She was eliminated in her second match by Zemfira Magomedalieva.

References

External links

Living people
1995 births
Place of birth missing (living people)
Mozambican women boxers
African Games medalists in boxing
African Games silver medalists for Mozambique
African Games bronze medalists for Mozambique
Competitors at the 2015 African Games
Competitors at the 2019 African Games
Boxers at the 2018 Commonwealth Games
Commonwealth Games competitors for Mozambique
Middleweight boxers
Boxers at the 2020 Summer Olympics
Olympic boxers of Mozambique
Boxers at the 2022 Commonwealth Games
20th-century Mozambican women
21st-century Mozambican women
Medallists at the 2022 Commonwealth Games
Commonwealth Games silver medallists for Mozambique
Commonwealth Games medallists in boxing